Hurst Lane railway station served the hamlet of Ogston, North East Derbyshire, England, from 1925 to 1936 on the Ashover Light Railway.

History 
The station was opened on 7 April 1925 by the Ashover Light Railway. It was known as Hurst Lane for Ogston Hall in the Derby Daily Telegraph. It was a request stop. It closed on 14 September 1936.

References 

Disused railway stations in Derbyshire
Railway stations in Great Britain opened in 1925
Railway stations in Great Britain closed in 1936
1925 establishments in England
1936 disestablishments in England